The 2023 Diriyah ePrix known for sponsorship reasons as the 2023 CORE Diriyah ePrix was a pair of scheduled Formula E electric car races held at the Riyadh Street Circuit in the town of Diriyah, north-west of Riyadh, in Saudi Arabia on 27 and 28 January 2023. It was the second round of the 2022–23 Formula E season, the fifth edition of the Diriyah ePrix and the third time the Diriyah ePrix was held at night.

Background
After the first round in Mexico City, Jake Dennis was leading the Drivers' Championship ahead of Pascal Wehrlein and Lucas di Grassi and Avalanche Andretti are leading the Teams' Championship ahead of Porsche Formula E and Mahindra Racing

Driver changes
After breaking his wrist in a crash at the 2023 Mexico City ePrix, Robin Frijns was unable to race in the Diriyah ePrix and was replaced by Kelvin van der Linde.

Classification
(All times are in AST)

Race one

Qualifying
Qualifying took place at 3:40 PM on January 27

Qualifying duels

Overall classification

Race
The race took place on January 27 at 8:03 PM.

Notes:
  – Pole position.
  – Fastest lap.

Race two

Qualifying
Qualifying took place at 3:40 PM on January 28

Qualifying duels

Overall classification

Race
The race took place on January 28 at 8:03 PM.

References

|- style="text-align:center"
|width="35%"|Previous race:2023 Mexico City ePrix
|width="30%"|FIA Formula E World Championship2022–23 season
|width="35%"|Next race:2023 Hyderabad ePrix
|- style="text-align:center"
|width="35%"|Previous race:2022 Diriyah ePrix
|width="30%"|Diriyah ePrix
|width="35%"|Next race:2024 Diriyah ePrix
|- style="text-align:center"

2023
2022–23 Formula E season
2023 in Saudi Arabian sport
January 2023 sports events in Saudi Arabia